Marcus Hook is a borough in Delaware County, Pennsylvania. The population was 2,397 at the 2010 census. The current mayor is Gene Taylor. The borough calls itself "The Cornerstone of Pennsylvania". The 2005 film One Last Thing... was set and partially filmed in Marcus Hook.

History

The earliest inhabitants of Marcus Hook were the Lenape Indians and their indigenous ancestors, whose succeeding cultures had occupied this area for thousands of years.

The Lenape had a major settlement in Marcus Hook; New Sweden colonists established a trading post here in the 1640s. The village was called Chammassungh, or "Finland" by the Swedes. It was located on the west side of the Delaware River, between Marcus Hook Creek and Naamans Creek. Dutch colonists renamed the settlement as "Marrites Hoeck" after they conquered the area in 1655.  The name is derived from the word Hook, meaning promontory, or point of land projecting into the water and Marcus, a corruption of the name of the Indian chief, called Maarte by the Dutch, who lived at the Hook.

English colonists gained control of the Dutch colonies and founded St. Martin's Church in 1699; the new church opened for worship in 1702.  Walter Martin of Upper Chichester founded this church as an alternative place of worship and burial for Christian non-Quakers.

Marcus Hook became a prosperous community and market town and in 1708 was of equal prominence to nearby Chester, Pennsylvania, with each location having approximately 100 houses.

In the early 1700s, Marcus Hook was a haven for pirates who plagued the lower Delaware River.  The market at Marcus Hook provided the pirates a place to sell plundered goods and re-supply away from the authorities and custom officials in Philadelphia. Early maps of Marcus Hook show the current Second Street was originally named "Discord Lane", since it was the location of the pirates' revelry when they were in town.

According to a local oral tradition, Marcus Hook Plank House was once the home of the mistress of the pirate Blackbeard.

By the mid-1700s, Marcus Hook became a major regional center for the building of wooden sailing ships and remained so until the late 19th century. By that time, larger tonnage ships became more popular than the sloops and schooners built in Marcus Hook.

During the American Revolutionary War, two tiers of underwater chevaux-de-frise obstacles were placed across the Delaware River at Marcus Hook to provide a first line of defense of Philadelphia against British naval forces.  Marcus Hook also served as a training center for the Pennsylvania militia.  The Continental Army was stationed at Marcus Hook during the fall of 1777. As the town was bombarded by British warships, there are very few pre-Revolutionary houses in Marcus Hook.

Marcus Hook served as a defensive post along the Delaware River during the War of 1812, with over 5,000 United States troops placed there.

The borough was officially incorporated on March 7, 1892. The convergence of rail, roads, a deep water port, and the nation's growing thirst for petroleum gave rise to the refineries that became the borough's dominant industry.

The Sun Oil Company opened the Marcus Hook refinery in 1901 to refine crude oil brought by ship from Texas.  It was the first of seven major refineries that made up the largest fuel-manufacturing center in the Northeast.  The refinery was closed in 2011 due to deteriorating market conditions.

In 1910, the American Viscose Corporation opened a plant in Marcus Hook for the production of rayon and other synthetic fibers.

On 4 Feb 1932, the MS Bidwell, a motor tanker belonging to Sun Oil, exploded and burned at the Sinclair Dock while tanks were being cleaned of residual crude oil in preparation for loading of gasoline. The first explosion occurred at 12:20 am and was followed by 3 more explosions within 25 minutes, resulting in 17 or 18 dead (all were crewmen, including captain) and 4 injured, including one crewman seriously injured. The disaster induced Sun Oil to develop cargo tank inerting and install it on all their ships from 1933 on.

Geography
Marcus Hook is located along the southern border of Delaware County (and Pennsylvania) at  (39.8182, -75.4155). It is bordered to the northwest by Lower Chichester Township, including the community of Linwood, to the northeast by the borough of Trainer, to the southeast across the Delaware River by Gloucester County, New Jersey, and to the southwest by New Castle County, Delaware.  The southern border of Marcus Hook is part of the Twelve-Mile Circle border between Pennsylvania and Delaware.

The lowest point in the state of Pennsylvania is located on the Delaware River in Marcus Hook, where it flows out of Pennsylvania and into Delaware. The borough has a humid subtropical climate (Cfa) and average monthly temperatures range from 33.1° F in January to 77.9° F in July. The hardiness zone is 7b.

Educational system

Marcus Hook is a part of Chichester School District. Children within the borough usually attend Marcus Hook Elementary School (Grades K-4), Chichester Middle School (Grades 5-8), or Chichester High School (Grades 9-12).

The area Catholic K-8 school is Holy Family Regional Catholic School in Aston. Marcus Hook previously had its own Catholic grade school, Immaculate Conception School. It closed in 1974, with students moved to Holy Savior School. That school merged into Holy Savior-St. John Fisher School in Linwood, which in turn merged into Holy Family in 2012.

Demographics

As of Census 2010, the racial makeup of the borough was 82.3% White, 13.6% African American, 0.1% Native American, 0.4% Asian, 0.3% from other races, and 3.6% from two or more races. Hispanic or Latino of any race were 3.0% of the population .

As of the census of 2000, there were 2,314 people, 919 households, and 565 families residing in the borough. The population density was 2,055.7 people per square mile (790.7/km²). There were 1,025 housing units at an average density of 910.6 per square mile (350.2/km²). The racial makeup of the borough was 91.44% White, 5.32% African American, 0.09% Native American, 0.61% Asian, 0.69% from other races, and 1.86% from two or more races. Hispanic or Latino of any race were 1.77% of the population.

There were 919 households, out of which 32.1% had children under the age of 18 living with them, 33.9% were married couples living together, 19.8% had a female householder with no husband present, and 38.5% were non-families. 31.8% of all households were made up of individuals, and 12.3% had someone living alone who was 65 years of age or older. The average household size was 2.52 and the average family size was 3.18.

In the borough the population was spread out, with 28.1% under the age of 18, 8.9% from 18 to 24, 31.5% from 25 to 44, 20.4% from 45 to 64, and 11.1% who were 65 years of age or older. The median age was 34 years. For every 100 females, there were 94.1 males. For every 100 females age 18 and over, there were 90.4 males.

The median income for a household in the borough was $28,219, and the median income for a family was $36,083. Males had a median income of $31,620 versus $24,569 for females. The per capita income for the borough was $13,738. About 13.3% of families and 21.7% of the population were below the poverty line, including 22.5% of those under age 18 and 16.5% of those age 65 or over.

Transportation

U.S. Route 13 (10th Street) is the main road through the borough, leading northeast  to Chester, and southwest  to Wilmington, Delaware. Marcus Hook station is a SEPTA train station on the Wilmington/Newark Line providing service to Center City Philadelphia, Wilmington, and Newark, Delaware. SEPTA Route 119 bus also services Marcus Hook along its route between Chester Transportation Center and Cheyney University.

Notable people

 Ron Bennington, Sirius Radio personality
 William Bucknell, businessman and benefactor of Bucknell University
 Elisha Cullen Dick, born at Blue Ball Inn, attending physician of George Washington at time of his death
Ralph Garzia, member of the Pennsylvania House of Representatives, 160th district
John Grubb, member of the Pennsylvania Provincial Assembly and original settler of Brandywine Hundred, buried at St. Martins Church
Robert E. Haebel, United States Marine Corps major general
 Billy "White Shoes" Johnson, NFL player
Albert Dutton MacDade, Pennsylvania State Senator and Judge in the Delaware County Court of Common Pleas
 Mickey Vernon, Major League Baseball player
 Curt Weldon, former congressman from Pennsylvania and former mayor of Marcus Hook

Religion
The Roman Catholic Archdiocese of Philadelphia operates Catholic churches. Immaculate Conception of Lourdes Church in Marcus Hook opened in January 1917. In 2013 Immaculate Conception merged with in St. John Fisher Church in Upper Chichester Township, with the Immaculate Conception parish closed.

References in popular culture
The 2005 American comedy-drama film One Last Thing..., about a sixteen year old terminally ill boy hoping his final wish is granted, takes place in Marcus Hook.

References

External links

 Borough of Marcus Hook official website
 Marcus Hook Preservation Society

Populated places established in 1655
Boroughs in Delaware County, Pennsylvania
1655 establishments in the Dutch Empire
1655 establishments in North America
1892 establishments in Pennsylvania
Establishments in New Netherland
Pennsylvania populated places on the Delaware River